The Multiethnic Indigenous Party ( - PIM) is a regional Nicaraguan political party founded in 1998 by the PLC dissident and Maranatha pastor Rayfield Hodgson, governor of the South Atlantic Autonomous Region from 1994 to 1998. The PIM contested in the 1998 Atlantic Coast Regional Elections and won 7 of the 45 seats on the RAAS Regional Council.

References

Political parties established in 1998
Political parties in Nicaragua
Indigenist political parties in North America
Regionalist parties